The Telephone Operator is a 1925 German silent comedy film directed by Hanns Schwarz and starring André Mattoni, Alexander Murski, and Willy Kaiser-Heyl. The film's art direction was by Erich Czerwonski. It was notable for the number of leading UFA technicians who worked on it. It premiered on 15 October 1925 at the Tauenzienpalast in Berlin. It is also known by the alternative title Liebe und Telefon.

Cast
André Mattoni as Frank Caruther
Alexander Murski as Baron Josua Caruther
Willy Kaiser-Heyl as Baron Conrad
Karl Platen as Jeff
Kurt Wichulla as Kind
Frida Richard as Aunt Betsy
Paul Biensfeldt as Notar
Frieda Türnowski as neighbour
Fritz Richard as provost
Hugo Döblin as usurer
Lydia Potechina as room landlady
Ellen Plessow as traveller
William Huch as valet
Mary Johnson as Mary Hard
Margarete Lanner

References

External links

1925 comedy films
Films of the Weimar Republic
German silent feature films
German comedy films
Films directed by Hanns Schwarz
UFA GmbH films
German black-and-white films
Silent comedy films
1920s German films